Harman Kardon (stylized as ) is a division of US-based Harman International Industries, a subsidiary of Samsung Electronics, and manufactures home and car audio equipment. 

Harman Kardon was originally founded in 1953 by business partners, Sidney Harman and Bernard Kardon.

History 
In the early 1950s, Sidney Harman was the general manager of the David Bogen Company, a manufacturer of public address systems at the time. Bernard Kardon (January 8, 1914 – April 14, 1993 in New Rochelle) was the chief engineer at Bogen. Due to management changes at Bogen in the early 1950s, both men resigned. With $5,000 investment each, Sidney Harman and Bernard Kardon founded the Harman Kardon Company in 1953.

In the 1950s Harman Kardon designed some of the first high fidelity audio products that initiated the modern consumer high fidelity business. The company's first product was an FM tuner.

The integrated receivers (with a tuner, preamplifier and power amplifier) was an attempt to create, improve and produce high fidelity performance in a single unit. Integrated receivers were not a novel concept as Scott Radio Laboratories had manufactured such items in the late 1930s. 

One year after its founding, in 1954, Harman Kardon introduced their first compact size high fidelity receiver, the Festival D1000. 
The D1000 was one of the world's first AM/FM compact Hi-Fi receivers, and a forerunner to today's integrated receivers. This monaural unit was aimed to introduce non-technical consumers to high fidelity and combined many now-familiar features such as a tuner, component control unit and amplifier in a single chassis. The shape, form function and size of the D1000 was a forerunner of the modern integrated receiver. Early Harman Kardon Hi-Fi equipment can be identified by a distinctive design of a copper plated chassis with a copper and black color scheme for panels and enclosures.

By 1956, Bernard Kardon decided to retire and sold his interest in the company to Sidney Harman. As the sole head of Harman Kardon, Harman continued to make the company a technical leader in Hi-Fi products. Sidney Harman would change the company's name to Harman International, but the receivers, tuners and amplifiers were still branded Harman Kardon. These products continue to be branded as Harman Kardon.

In 1958, Harman Kardon introduced one of the first stereo receivers, the Festival TA230, once again aimed at non-technical users with the intention of making high-fidelity stereo widely available. Stereo sound was achieved by using one channel from the AM band, and one channel from the FM band. This early form of stereophonic reception was called simulcast stereo. Early FM broadcast signals did not have the stereo carrier (pilot) signal that carried the stereo left and right channels. After the stereo signal standard was established, a stereo multiplex circuit connected to or built into the receiver was used to decode the stereo signal. The first true FM Multiplex Stereo Receiver was sold by H.H. Scott in 1961 with introduction of the Model 350 tuner.

In 1959, Harman Kardon marketed the Citation II, an early ultra wideband stereophonic tube amplifier. It featured 60 watts/channel output with a frequency response of 18-60,000 Hz at 20 watt output. The company promoted their philosophy of designing high fidelity sound using amplifiers that provided widest possible audio bandwidth. Although the human ear highest audible range is around 20,000 Hz, the full range of sound goes beyond that with harmonics and overtones that may be beyond the hearing range of the human ear. These harmonics interact with other frequencies to produce audible secondary sounds or interference.

In 1969 Harman bought the major speaker manufacturer JBL. In 1970 Harman marketed the first stereophonic cassette recording deck with Dolby B noise reduction.

In 1976, Harman supported Jimmy Carter's bid to become President of the United States. When Carter became President, he appointed Harman to be the Deputy Secretary of Commerce. As US law required appointees to have no direct business interests in day-to-day activities, Harman had to sell the company, and he sold the company to Beatrice Foods, a large conglomerate, for $100 million.

1980 brought the introduction of the Citation XX high current amplifier, which provided quicker response to large signal transitions from the power amplifier to the speakers. The Citation XX amplifier was called "the world's best-sounding power amplifier" by the editors of The Audio Critic magazine. The amplifier was designed by Finnish engineer  who discovered transient intermodulation distortion (TIM) in 1970 and worked to mitigate its effects in the following years. The Citation XX was a project to get the best possible measurements of output signals, and the best perceived sound. A record player with tangential pick-up arm Rabco was released in 1980, too.

After the Carter presidency, Harman regained ownership of Harman International. In 1980 he purchased Harman International from Beatrice Foods for $55 million. However, the receiver group was not included in the purchase because Beatrice Foods had previously sold the group to the Japanese company Shin-Shirasuna. The Harman Kardon receiver group was the heart of Harman International, and in 1985 Harman purchased the receiver group and returned the company to its pre-1976 form.

From 1999 to 2007, Harman Kardon worked to develop digital processing for audio products. In 1999 the company introduced the CDR-2 compact disc recorder, the first with 4X high speed dubbing. In 2000, Harman Kardon produced the AVR-7000 audio-video receiver, which was able to decode and process HDCD.

Harman retired in 2007 at the age of 88. At that time he hired technology executive Dinesh Paliwal to succeed him as CEO.

On March 11, 2017, Samsung Electronics announced the acquisition of Harman for a reported purchase price of $US8 billion.

Other products

SoundSticks

The Harman Kardon iSub 2000 Subwoofer and SoundSticks were introduced at the July 2000 Macworld expo. Harman Kardon partnered with Apple to design and manufacture these products.

Apple did the industrial design and mechanical engineering to have the product fit into the Apple product family. This product won an Industrial Design Excellence Awards gold award and was featured on the cover of I.D. magazine. The SoundSticks II were a minor upgrade, with the addition of capacitive volume control buttons and a 3.5mm mini-jack input replacing the previous USB input. The SoundSticks III were a further update changing the styling slightly using black highlights and white lighting to match the new iMacs, instead of green and blue of the original SoundSticks and the SoundSticks II. The Soundsticks Wireless introduced the capability to accept Bluetooth inputs. However, it retains the wires between the speakers.

Car audio
Harman Kardon supplies or supplied audio equipment to several vehicle manufacturers including Volkswagen, Audi, BMW, Land Rover, Mercedes-Benz, MG Rover, Volvo, Buick, Kia, Hyundai, Ssangyong, MINI, Saab, Harley-Davidson, Chrysler, Alfa Romeo, Dodge, Jeep, Ram, Daihatsu, Toyota, Honda, Jaguar, Suzuki, Mitsubishi, Nissan, Subaru and Tata Motors.

Computer speakers 
Harman Kardon has made desktop computer speakers. Harman Kardon has also made laptop speakers, which have been used in certain models of Toshiba, Acer notebooks, Asus laptops, Apple iMacs and Huawei's M5 tablets. A pair of Harman Kardon transparent spherical speakers, along with the Apple G4 Mac Cube for which they were designed and produced from 2000 to 2001, are housed in the permanent collection of New York's Museum of Modern Art.

Smart speakers 
In 2017, Harman Kardon released a smart speaker, powered by the Microsoft Cortana virtual assistant, called Invoke. In August 2018, Harman Kardon announced the Citation 500, a US$700 smart speaker running the Google Assistant.
In 2021, Harman Kardon has collaborated with Xiaomi for its newest smartphones, the Xiaomi Mi 11 series are the first smartphones to feature with Harman Kardon-tuned dual speaker setup.

Equipment photo gallery

See also
 List of phonograph manufacturers

References

External links 

 Official website

Audio amplifier manufacturers
Compact Disc player manufacturers
Consumer electronics brands
Harman International
In-car entertainment
Loudspeaker manufacturers
Phonograph manufacturers
History of radio
American businesspeople
Companies based in Stamford, Connecticut